The 1995–96 NBA season was the 28th season for the Phoenix Suns in the National Basketball Association. During the off-season, the Suns acquired Hot Rod Williams from the Cleveland Cavaliers, and signed free agent Tony Smith. The Suns struggled with a 13–13 start to the season, then lost eight of their next nine games. Head coach Paul Westphal, who had led the Suns to the 1993 NBA Finals, went 14–19 before being replaced by Cotton Fitzsimmons, who would come on to coach in his third stint with the Suns, while Smith was traded to the Miami Heat in exchange for rookie guard Terrence Rencher at midseason. The team played above .500 for the remainder of the season, as they held a 22–24 record at the All-Star break, and finished fourth in the Pacific Division, and seventh in the Western Conference with a 41–41 record. All home games were played at America West Arena. They were also one of the nine teams to defeat the 72–10 Chicago Bulls.

Charles Barkley led the Suns with 23.2 points, 11.6 rebounds and 1.6 steals per game, while point guard Kevin Johnson averaged 18.7 points, led the team with 9.2 assists, and contributed 1.5 steals per game in only 56 games due to hamstring and groin injuries. In addition, top draft pick Michael Finley, a rookie from the University of Wisconsin, who was selected by the Suns as the 21st pick in the 1995 NBA draft, appeared in all 82 regular season games, averaging 15.0 points and 4.6 rebounds per game, while leading the team with 39.2 minutes per game, and was later named to the NBA All-Rookie First Team. Sixth man Danny Manning averaged 13.4 points per game off the bench, but only played just 33 games due to a torn ACL, and sprained ankle. Second-year guard Wesley Person provided the team with 12.7 points per game, while Wayman Tisdale contributed 10.7 points per game off the bench, Elliott Perry contributed 8.6 points and 4.4 assists per game, A.C. Green provided with 7.5 points and 6.8 rebounds per game, and Hot Rod Williams averaged 7.3 points and 6.0 rebounds per game, and led the team with 1.5 blocks per game.

Despite playing all 82 games, Finley suffered an ankle injury on the final day of the regular season, and did not play in any of the Suns' playoff games. Without Finley, the Suns were eliminated from the playoffs by the San Antonio Spurs, three games to one in the Western Conference First Round.

Barkley also made his 10th consecutive All-Star appearance, being selected for the 1996 NBA All-Star Game. The power forward, who had turned 33 years of age during the season, made his 11th All-NBA Team, appearing as a selection on the Third Team. It was the first time in Barkley's career he had not been selected to the First or Second Team. Following the season, Barkley was traded to the Houston Rockets after four seasons in Phoenix, while Perry was dealt to the Milwaukee Bucks, and Rencher was released to free agency.

Offseason

NBA draft

The Suns received the 21st pick from a trade with the Los Angeles Lakers in 1994. With the pick they would select future All-Star swingman Michael Finley from Wisconsin. Finley averaged 18.7 points, 5.6 rebounds and 3.2 assists per game in four years with the Badgers. On October 4, the Suns signed Finley to a three-year rookie contract for $2.17 million. In his rookie season, Finley would average 15.0 points, 4.6 rebounds, 3.5 assists and 1.0 steal per game, earning NBA All-Rookie First Team honors. Finley was traded to the Dallas Mavericks midway through his sophomore season for All-Star point guard Jason Kidd.

The Suns used their first-round pick to select small forward Mario Bennett from Arizona State. Bennett averaged 15.7 points and 7.8 rebounds per game in three years with the Sun Devils. On October 4, the Suns signed Bennett to a three-year rookie contract for $1.66 million. Bennett underwent knee surgery before the season and remained on the injured reserve until March 1. Bennett would appear in just 19 regular season games, starting in 14 due to injuries, and two playoff games before being waived prior to the 1996–97 season.

The Suns used their second-round pick to select shooting guard Chris Carr from Southern Illinois. Carr averaged 13.5 points and 5.8 rebounds per game in three years with the Salukis. On October 2, the Suns signed Carr to a one-year rookie contract for $200,000. Carr appeared in 60 regular season games, starting in ten, and three playoff games. Carr would sign as a free agent with the Minnesota Timberwolves after the season.

Roster

Regular season

Standings

Record vs. opponents

Playoffs

Game log

|- align="center" bgcolor="#ffcccc"
| 1
| April 26
| @ San Antonio
| L 98–120
| Charles Barkley (26)
| Charles Barkley (12)
| Kevin Johnson (11)
| Alamodome16,545
| 0–1
|- align="center" bgcolor="#ffcccc"
| 2
| April 28
| @ San Antonio
| L 105–110
| Charles Barkley (30)
| Charles Barkley (20)
| Kevin Johnson (16)
| Alamodome19,507
| 0–2
|- align="center" bgcolor="#ccffcc"
| 3
| May 1
| San Antonio
| W 94–93
| Charles Barkley (25)
| Charles Barkley (13)
| Kevin Johnson (8)
| America West Arena19,023
| 1–2
|- align="center" bgcolor="#ffcccc"
| 4
| May 3
| San Antonio
| L 98–116
| Charles Barkley (21)
| Charles Barkley (9)
| Kevin Johnson (8)
| America West Arena19,023
| 1–3
|-

Awards and honors

Week/Month
 Kevin Johnson was named Player of the Week for games played April 1 through April 7.
 Charles Barkley was named Player of the Month for February.

All-Star
 Charles Barkley was voted as a starter for the Western Conference in the All-Star Game. It was his tenth consecutive All-Star selection. Barkley finished first in voting among Western Conference players with 1,268,195 votes.
 Other Suns players receiving All-Star votes were: A. C. Green (269,175).
 Michael Finley was selected to compete in the Slam Dunk Contest. Finley finished second, losing to champion Brent Barry in the final round.
 Michael Finley was selected to compete for the Western Conference in the Rookie Challenge.

Season
 Charles Barkley was named to the All-NBA Third Team. Barkley also finished 12th in MVP voting.
 Michael Finley was named to the NBA All-Rookie First Team. Finley also finished tied in fourth in Rookie of the Year voting.

Injuries/Missed Games
 10/31/95: Mario Bennett: Knee chondromalacia; placed on injured reserve until March 1
 10/31/95: John Coker: Foot stress fracture; placed on injured reserve until March 8
 10/31/95: Danny Manning: Torn ACL; placed on injured list until February 1
 11/10/95: Kevin Johnson:  Strained knee tendon; out until November 18
 11/27/95: Wayman Tisdale: Sore shoulder; did not play
 12/02/95: Kevin Johnson: Sore hamstring; did not play
 12/08/95: Charles Barkley: Flu; did not play
 12/08/95: Elliot Perry: Bruised lower back; did not play
 12/16/95: Kevin Johnson: Strained groin; out until January 21
 12/16/95: Stefano Rusconi: Flu; did not play
 12/19/95: Hot Rod Williams: Sprained knee; out until December 27
 01/04/96: Stefano Rusconi: Injured achilles tendon; out until waived on January 31
 01/09/96: Charles Barkley: Sore toe; out until January 21
 01/09/96: Hot Rod Williams: Leg nerve irritation; out until January 28
 02/08/96: Kevin Johnson: Strained hamstring, strained groin; out until February 19
 02/13/96: Wayman Tisdale: Injured eye; did not play
 03/01/96: Terrence Rencher: Sprained ankle; placed on injured list until April 22
 03/07/96: Wayman Tisdale: Bruised shoulder; did not play
 03/08/96: Wayman Tisdale: Strained shoulder; placed on injured list until March 29
 03/13/96: Danny Manning: Sprained ankle; out until March 21
 03/29/96: John Coker: Sore foot, placed on injured list until April 22
 04/02/96: Mario Bennett: Flu; out until April 10
 04/07/96: Danny Manning: Knee tendinitis; out until April 16
 04/10/96: Hot Rod Williams: Injured hand, wrist, foot; out until April 19
 04/14/96: Joe Kleine: Fainting spell; out until April 26
 04/16/96: Charles Barkley: Strained calf; out until April 26
 04/21/96: Kevin Johnson: Strained calf; did not play
 04/26/96: Michael Finley: Sprained ankle; did not play
 04/28/96: Michael Finley: Sprained ankle; did not play
 05/01/96: Michael Finley: Sprained ankle; did not play
 05/03/96: Michael Finley: Sprained ankle; did not play

Player statistics

Season

* – Stats with the Suns.
† – Minimum 300 field goals made.
^ – Minimum 82 three-pointers made.
# – Minimum 125 free-throws made.

Playoffs

Transactions

Trades

Free agents

Additions

Subtractions

Player Transactions Citation:

References

 Standings on Basketball Reference

Phoenix Suns seasons